Mahoran may refer to:
 Something of, from, or related to Mayotte
 A person from Mayotte, or of Mahoran descent, as described in Demographics of Mayotte and Culture of Mayotte
 One of the languages of Mayotte
 Mahoran cuisine

See also 
 List of all pages beginning with "Mahoran"

Language and nationality disambiguation pages